Spring Run is a tributary of Flaugherty Run in Allegheny County, Pennsylvania, in the United States.

Course
Spring Run begins in Crescent, near Brodhead Road. It flows northeast and reaches its confluence with Flaugherty Run.

Tributaries
Spring Run has no named tributaries. However, it does have an unnamed tributary which joins Spring Run about halfway down its length.

Geography and geology

Watershed

History
Spring Run was entered into the Geographic Names Information System on August 2, 1979. Its identifier in the Geographic Names Information System is 1188258.

See also
Boggs Run, next tributary of Flaugherty Run going upstream
List of rivers of Pennsylvania

References

Rivers of Allegheny County, Pennsylvania
Rivers of Pennsylvania
Rivers of Pennsylvania

References